İrfan in University is a 2013 Turkish animated short film written and directed by Rıdvan Çevik, and produced by Anadolu University. The film won the Best Balkan Film Award at the 2013 Anibar International Animation Festival.

Plot 
One day a boy named İrfan comes into university. He is the last person that could be educated and how would he get out?

References

External links
 Teaser on Vimeo

2010s animated short films
Turkish animated films
Turkish short films
Turkish animated short films